Mike Drew Brook is a stream in Mille Lacs County, in the U.S. state of Minnesota.

Mike Drew Brook bears the name of a local lumberman. Brook developed much of the land around the area on behalf of the lumber industry.

See also
List of rivers of Minnesota

References

Rivers of Mille Lacs County, Minnesota
Rivers of Minnesota